Olesya Vladimirovna Zheleznyak (born November 11, 1974) is a Russian theater and film actress, TV presenter. Winner of the All-Russian Theater Prize  (2002).

Biography
Olesya Zheleznyak was born on November 11, 1974 in Moscow.

Mother worked as a seamstress, father   — a loader. There is an older sister Lyudmila.

In childhood, she studied at the choreographic studio.

In 1999 she graduated from the Russian Academy of Theatre Arts (Mark Zakharov's course) and was accepted into the troupe of the Lenkom Theatre. Her first performance was  The Barbarian and the Heretic. Became popular after a successful film debut in the film  Silver Lily of the Valley by Tigran Keosayan.

In 2015, the Russian duplicated the role of the Sadness in the animated film Inside Out.

Selected filmography
 Silver Lily of the Valley (2000) as Zoya Misochkina
 Balakirev the Buffoon (2002) as Dunya Burykina
 My Fair Nanny (2004—2008) as Galya Kopylova
 Love in the Big City (2009) as Pelageya
 Svaty (2010—2017) as Larisa
 8 First Dates (2012) as Zinaida Ivanovna
 And Here's What's Happening to Me  (2012) as Nastya

Personal life
Olesya is married to actor Spartak Sumchenko (born 1973). Spouses have four children.

References

External links
 Official website

1974 births
Actresses from Moscow
Living people
Russian film actresses
Russian stage actresses
Russian voice actresses
Russian television actresses
21st-century Russian actresses
Russian Academy of Theatre Arts alumni
Russian television presenters
Russian women television presenters